Hugues Briatte (born 11 March 1990) is a French rugby union player. His position is Number 8 and he currently plays for CA Brive in the Rugby Pro D2. He began his career with Stade Français, before moving to CA Brive in 2012.

References

1990 births
Living people
French rugby union players
Sportspeople from Suresnes
Stade Français players
CA Brive players
Rugby union number eights